Angst is a 2000 black comedy directed by Daniel Nettheim and starring Sam Lewis, Jessica Napier, Justin Smith and Abi Tucker. It was written by Anthony O'Connor. It was shot in and around Sydney, Australia. The film was released in Australian theatres on 31 August 2000.

Plot

Angst tells the story of a group of horror film devotees living in Sydney's King's Cross. There is Dean (Sam Lewis), a cynical, sexually frustrated video store employee with a bad case of unresolved love. Then there are his flatmates Ian (Justin Smith) and Jade (Jessica Napier) - Ian works in an adult bookstore, waiting for his break as a stand-up comedian, whereas Jade does not work at all, content to smoke pot and watch videos while she can still get away with it. Wandering into the characters' lives is street kid Mole (Luke Lennox), who challenges Jade's lifestyle by stealing the trio's trusty VCR, and the alluring May (Abi Tucker), a goth chick on whom Dean develops an over-the-counter crush.

Cast
 Sam Lewis as Dean
 Jessica Napier as Jade
 Justin Smith as Ian
 Abi Tucker as May
 Luke Lennox as Mole
 Lara Cox as Heather
 Emmanuel Marshall as Simon
 Johnathan Devoy as Logan
 Paul Zebrowski as Steve
 Celia Ireland as Case Worker
 Joel McIlroy as Chook

Reception
ABC's Julie Rigg described the production as a "sweetly enjoyable film which almost works".

Box office
Angst took $58,850 at the box office in Australia, which is equivalent to $73,318 in 2009 dollars.

Awards
 2000 - Won Australian Screen Sound Guild for Best Achievement in Sound for Sound Effects Editing for a Feature Film
 2000 - Won IF Awards for Best Music
 2000 - Nominated IF Awards for Best Sound Design

References

External links
 Angst official website (requires flash)
 Angst at Oz Movies
 
 Angst at the National Film and Sound Archive

2000 films
2000 comedy-drama films
2000 black comedy films
Australian black comedy films
Australian comedy-drama films
Films set in Sydney
2000s English-language films